"You Never Gave Up on Me" is a song written by Leslie Pearl, and recorded by American country music artist Crystal Gayle.  It was released in February 1982 as the second single from the album Hollywood, Tennessee.  The song reached number 5 on the Billboard Hot Country Singles & Tracks chart.

Charts

Weekly charts

Year-end charts

References

1982 singles
Crystal Gayle songs
Song recordings produced by Allen Reynolds
Columbia Records singles
1981 songs
Songs written by Leslie Pearl